Pedro Manuel Ortega Silvera  (born 2 February 1982 in Baranoa) is a Colombian footballer who plays for Deportes Quindío in the Copa Mustang.

Club career
Ortega previously played for Junior.

External links

Profile at BDFA
Profile at GolGolGol.net

1982 births
Living people
Colombian footballers
Atlético Junior footballers
Deportes Quindío footballers
Association footballers not categorized by position